The 1991–92 B Group was the thirty-sixth season of the Bulgarian B Football Group, the second tier of the Bulgarian football league system. A total of 19 teams contested the league.

League table

References

1991-92
Bul
2